Arthur Hennell Simms, MA (1853 – 1921) was an Anglican priest and the Archdeacon of Totnes from 1910 until his death.

He was educated at Trinity College, Cambridge. He served curacies at Lifton and Clifton and incumbencies at Churchstow, Wolborough, Cambridge, Ely and Torquay until his years as an archdeacon.

Notes

1853 births
Alumni of Trinity College, Cambridge
Archdeacons of Totnes
1921 deaths